The Treason Act 1790 (30 Geo 3 c 48) was an Act of the Parliament of the Kingdom of Great Britain which abolished burning at the stake as the penalty for women convicted of high treason, petty treason and abetting, procuring or counselling petty treason, and replaced it with drawing and hanging.

Identical provision was made for Ireland by the Treason by Women Act (Ireland) 1796.

Section 1

The original penalty for high treason, petty treason or abetting counselling or procuring petty treason for women was to be drawn to the place of execution and burned to death. This was replaced, with effect from 5 June 1790, with drawing to the place of execution followed by hanging by section 1. The section was amended by the Forfeiture Act 1870 to abolish drawing.

Section 2

This section made provision for women convicted of petty treason to suffer additional punishments which were already provided for murder by the Murder Act 1751 (25 Geo.2 c.37), ss. 1 - 10. This included provision for the disposal of the body.

The repeal of this section for England and Wales on 1 July 1828 by section 1 of the Offences against the Person Act 1828 was consequential on the abolition of petty treason by sections 1 and 2 of that Act.

Section 3

This section allowed the King to alter the sentence of any woman condemned to burning having been convicted of those offences prior to (the commencement of section 1 on) 5 June 1790. By warrant under the hand of one of the principal Secretaries of State, the King had the discretionary ("if he shall think proper") authority to order that the condemned woman be hanged in the execution of that judgement. This section was repealed by the Statute Law Revision Act 1871.

Section 4

This section was a saving clause and provided that women convicted of those offences would still be liable to such forfeitures and corruption of blood as they would have been if they had been attainted of those offences before the passing of the Act.

This section was repealed by the Statute Law Revision Act 1960.

Repeal

The Act was repealed when the death penalty for treason was abolished by the Crime and Disorder Act 1998.

See also
Capital punishment in the United Kingdom
High treason in the United Kingdom
Treason Act

References

External links
The Treason Act 1790 (at the time of its repeal in 1998), from the National Archives.

Great Britain Acts of Parliament 1790
Treason in the United Kingdom